Mapello is a comune (municipality) in the Province of Bergamo in the Italian region of Lombardy, located about  northeast of Milan and about  west of Bergamo.

Mapello borders the following municipalities: Ambivere, Barzana, Bonate Sopra, Brembate di Sopra, Palazzago, Ponte San Pietro, Presezzo, Sotto il Monte Giovanni XXIII, Terno d'Isola.

Demographic evolution

References